The 1969 World Table Tennis Championships – Swaythling Cup (men's team) was the 30th edition of the men's team championship.  

Japan won the gold medal defeating West Germany 5–3 in the final. Yugoslavia won the bronze medal after winning the third place play off. The Chinese team were again absent.

Medalists

Swaythling Cup tables

Second stage round

Group 1

Group 2

Third-place playoff

Final

See also
List of World Table Tennis Championships medalists

References

-